Mühlwald is a comune (municipality) in South Tyrol, a province in northern Italy, located about  northeast of Bolzano, on the border with Austria.

Geography

The municipality of Mühlwald contains the frazioni of (subdivisions, mainly villages and hamlets) Außermühlwald and Lappach (Lappago).

Mühlwald borders the following municipalities: Sand in Taufers, Kiens, Pfalzen, Finkenberg (Austria), Gais, Terenten, Pfitsch, Ahrntal, and Vintl.

History

Coat-of-arms
The emblem represents four fir-trees, touching the edge at the top and a water wheel on the bottom, all on a silver background. The trees symbolize the forest and the wheel the mill depicting the name of the place. The emblem was adopted in 1967.

Society

Linguistic distribution
According to the 2001 census, 98.90% of the population speak German, 0.90% Italian and 0.21% Ladin as first language.

Demographic evolution

References

External links
 Homepage of the municipality

Municipalities of South Tyrol